This is a list of schools in North District, Hong Kong.

Secondary schools

 Government
  (粉嶺官立中學)
 Sheung Shui Government Secondary School

 Aided
  (明愛粉嶺陳震夏中學)
  (中華基督教會基新中學)
  (宣道會陳朱素華紀念中學)
  (新界喇沙中學)
  (風采中學（教育評議會主辦）) - Education Convergence sponsors this school
  (粉嶺救恩書院)
  (粉嶺禮賢會中學)
  (鳳溪廖萬石堂中學)
  (鳳溪第一中學)
  (香海正覺蓮社佛教馬錦燦紀念英文中學)
  (香港道教聯合會鄧顯紀念中學)
  (保良局馬錦明中學)
  (聖公會陳融中學)SKH Chan Young Secondary School
  (聖芳濟各書院)
 Tin Ka Ping Secondary School
 TWGH Kap Yan Directors' College
 TWGH Li Ka Shing College

 Direct Subsidy Scheme
  (基督教香港信義會心誠中學)

 Private
 International College Hong Kong (NT)
 Rudolf Steiner Education Foundation Hong Kong Maria College

Primary schools

 Government
 Fanling Government Primary School (粉嶺官立小學)

 Aided
 Alliance Primary School, Sheung Shui (上水宣道小學)
 Fanling Assembly of God Church Primary School (基督教粉嶺神召會小學)
 Fanling Public School (粉嶺公立學校)
 FSFTF Fong Shu Chuen Primary School (方樹福堂基金方樹泉小學)
 Fuk Tak Education Society Primary School (福德學社小學)
 Fung Kai Innovative School (鳳溪創新小學)
 Fung Kai Liu Yun-sum Memorial College (鳳溪廖潤琛紀念學校)
 Fung Kai No. 1 Primary School (鳳溪第一小學)
 HHCKLA Buddhist Chan Shi Wan Primary School (香海正覺蓮社佛教陳式宏學校)
 HHCKLA Buddhist Ching Kok Lin Association School (香海正覺蓮社佛教正覺蓮社學校)
 HHCKLA Buddhist Wisdom Primary School (香海正覺蓮社佛教正慧小學)
 Kam Tsin Village Ho Tung School (金錢村何東學校)
 Lee Chi Tat Memorial School (李志達紀念學校)
 Pentecostal Gin Mao Sheng Primary School (五旬節靳茂生小學)
 Pentecostal Yu Leung Fat Primary School (五旬節于良發小學)
 Pui Ling School of the Precious Blood (寶血會培靈學校)
 Salvation Army C C F Queen's Hill School (救世軍中原慈善基金皇后山學校)
 Sha Tau Kok Central Primary School (沙頭角中心小學)
 Shek Wu Hui Public School (石湖墟公立學校)
 SKH Ka Fuk Wing Chun Primary School (聖公會嘉福榮真小學)
 SKH Wing Chun Primary School (聖公會榮真小學)
 Ta Ku Ling Ling Ying Public School (打鼓嶺嶺英公立學校)
 Tsang Mui Millennium School (曾梅千禧學校)
 Tung Koon School (東莞學校)
 TWGH Hong Kong and Kowloon Electrical Appliances Merchants Association Limited School (東華三院港九電器商聯會小學)
 TWGHS Ma Kam Chan Memorial Primary School (東華三院馬錦燦紀念小學)
 TWGHS Tseng Hin Pei Primary School (東華三院曾憲備小學)
 Wai Chow Public School (Sheung Shui) (上水惠州公立學校)
 Yuk Yin School (育賢學校)

Special schools

 Aided
 HHCKLA Buddhist Po Kwong School (香海正覺蓮社佛教普光學校)
 Hong Kong Red Cross Hospital Schools North District Hospital (香港紅十字會醫院學校)
 Salvation Army Shek Wu School (救世軍石湖學校)

References

Lists of schools in Hong Kong
North District, Hong Kong